Prosphytochloa is a genus of African plants in the grass family. The only known species is Prosphytochloa prehensilis, native to Eastern Cape Province, KwaZulu-Natal, Eswatini, Mpumalanga, and Limpopo.

References

Oryzoideae
Flora of Southern Africa
Monotypic Poaceae genera